Ferdinando Bocconi (11 November 1836 – 5 February 1908) was an Italian politician. He is mostly known for being the founder of Bocconi University in Milan in 1902.

Bocconi was born and died in Milan. The university was named after his son, Luigi Bocconi, who died in the Battle of Adwa during the First Italo-Ethiopian War.

References

Bocconi University
1836 births
1908 deaths
Politicians from Milan
Burials at the Cimitero Monumentale di Milano